The 2018–19 Missouri Tigers women's basketball team represents the University of Missouri in the 2018–19 NCAA Division I women's basketball season. The Tigers were led by ninth-year head coach Robin Pingeton. They play their games at Mizzou Arena and are members of the Southeastern Conference. They finished the season 24–11, 11–5 in SEC play to finish in fifth place. They advanced to the semifinals of the SEC women's tournament where they lost to Mississippi State. They received an at-large to the NCAA women's tournament where they defeated Drake in the first round before losing to Iowa in the second round.

Previous season
The Tigers began the 2017–18 season ranked #16 in both the AP and Coaches Polls. They finished the season 24–8, 11–5 in SEC play to finish in a four-way tie for fourth place. Ranked 14th nationally, they advanced to the quarterfinals of the SEC women's tournament where they lost to 19th-ranked Georgia. They received an at-large to the NCAA women's tournament where they were upset by Florida Gulf Coast in the first round.

Roster

Schedule

|-
!colspan=9 style=| Exhibition

|-
!colspan=9 style=| Non-conference regular season

|-
!colspan=9 style=| SEC regular season

|-
!colspan=9 style=| SEC Women's Tournament

 

|-
!colspan=12 style=| NCAA Women's Tournament

Rankings

^Coaches did not release a Week 2 poll.

References

Missouri Tigers women's basketball seasons
Missouri
Missouri, basketball women
Missouri, basketball women
Missouri